Major General Ihor Ivanovych Taburets (born on 6 December 1973), is a Ukrainian politician, activist, and intelligence officer who is currently the Governor of Cherkasy Oblast since 1 March 2022.

Biography

Igor Taburets was born on 6 December 1973 in Cherkasy. Nothing is known about his childhood and youth.

Taburets worked as an adviser to the former Governor of Cherkasy Oblast Oleksandr Skichko. He also served in the Main Intelligence Directorate of the Ministry of Defense of Ukraine as a major general, and a former deputy chief of the Main Directorate of Intelligence of the Ministry of Defense of Ukraine. He was also an advisor to the Committee of the Verkhovna Rada on National Security, Defense and Intelligence.

On 1 March 2022, President of Ukraine Volodymyr Zelenskyy appointed Taburets as Governor of Cherkasy Oblast.

References

1973 births
Living people
Politicians from Cherkasy
Governors of Cherkasy Oblast